Village of Oak Creek is an unincorporated community located within Big Park a census-designated place (CDP) in Yavapai County, Arizona, United States. The population was 6,147 at the 2010 census, up from 5,245 in 2000. Big Park is the name of the CDP while the community is more commonly known as the Village of Oak Creek (VOC), and is a bedroom community for Sedona, located seven miles away. Tourism and service to retirees and second-home owners are the basis for the local economy. Big Park, the pioneers' name for the large open area that became the Village of Oak Creek in the early 1960s, is set among scenic red-rock buttes and canyons. The Bell Rock scenic area adjoins the north end of VOC, and the town is surrounded by the Coconino National Forest. A Forest Service Visitor Center is located at the south end of VOC.

Big Park's FIPS code is 07570. Residents of VOC have a Sedona ZIP code, 86351.

Geography
, Big Park / Village of Oak Creek is a designated Dark Sky Community.

Demographics

Village of Oak Creek first appeared as the Oak Creek Precinct in 1910. It did not reappear on the census again until 1990, when it was called Big Park and was made a census-designated place (CDP). In 2010, the name was changed to the present Village of Oak Creek (although alternatively called Big Park on census documents).

As of the census of 2000, there were 5,245 people, 2,560 households, and 1,602 families residing in the CDP. The racial makeup of the CDP was 95.6% White, 0.4% Black or African American, 0.4% Native American, 0.6% Asian, <0.1% Pacific Islander, 1.5% from other races, and 1.6% from two or more races.  6.8% of the population were Hispanic or Latino of any race.

There were 2,560 households, out of which 14.2% had children under the age of 18 living with them, 55.3% were married couples living together, 5.4% had a female householder with no husband present, and 37.4% were non-families. 30.9% of all households were made up of individuals, and 17.1% had someone living alone who was 65 years of age or older.  The average household size was 2.01 and the average family size was 2.44.

In the CDP, the population was spread out, with 12.7% under the age of 18, 3.1% from 18 to 24, 17.7% from 25 to 44, 33.0% from 45 to 64, and 33.4% who were 65 years of age or older.  The median age was 56 years. For every 100 females, there were 83.3 males.  For every 100 females age 18 and over, there were 81.5 males.

The median income for a household in the CDP was $38,477, and the median income for a family was $46,268. Males had a median income of $38,007 versus $24,826 for females. The per capita income for the CDP was $30,026.  About 5.8% of families and 8.4% of the population were below the poverty line, including 21.7% of those under age 18 and 2.6% of those age 65 or over.

Arts
The Verde Valley Music Festival was held on the first weekend of each October at the Verde Valley School, just west of VOC. The Festival was a fundraiser for Native American scholarships at VVS, and long benefited from the sponsorship and generosity of Jackson Browne, whose son attended the school. Normally a mostly-acoustical show, past headliners include Browne (who almost always performs), Neil Young, and Bruce Cockburn.

Education
The Village of Oak Creek is served by the Sedona-Oak Creek Unified School District, and hosts the Big Park Community School (K-6), "Home of the Coyotes".

Verde Valley School, an International Baccalaureate boarding/college preparatory high school with many international and Native American students, is located between the Oak Creek and Red Rock Crossing. VVS was founded in 1948 by Hamilton and Barbara Warren. Scholars who helped found the school and guide its early years included Harvard anthropologist Clyde Kluckhohn, anthropologist Margaret Mead, and John Collier, Commissioner of Indian Affairs during the Franklin Roosevelt administration.

Notable people
English portrait and abstract artist Kevin Geary moved to the Village of Oak Creek in 2008.

See also

 List of census-designated places in Arizona

References

External links

 
 Welcome to Red Rock Country! Coconino National Forest.
 Photos of area
 The Jack and Helen Frye story

Census-designated places in Yavapai County, Arizona